The Revolutionary Febrerista Party (PRF) is a democratic socialist party of Paraguay. It was established in 1951 by Rafael Franco, President of Paraguay from the February Revolution of 1936 until his overthrow in August 1937.

History
In 1936, Rafael Franco came to power in the February Revolution. A year and a half later, he was overthrown in a coup that brought the Liberal Party's Félix Paiva to power and went into exile. Franco established the Revolutionary Febrerista Party, named after the revolution, on 11 December 1951 in Buenos Aires, Argentina.

The party was initially banned in Paraguay, which was under a Colorado Party regime at the time. The party was legalised in 1964 as it was no longer deemed to be a threat to President Alfredo Stroessner. In the 1967 Constitutional Assembly elections, it won three of the 120 seats. In the general elections the following year, the party failed to win a Senate seat but won one seat in the Chamber of Deputies.

After 1968, the party did not contest another national election until the overthrow of the Stroessner regime in 1989. In the elections that year, they won two seats in the Chamber of Deputies. In the 1991 Constitutional Assembly elections, they won a single seat. For the 1993 elections, it was part of the National Encounter Party coalition, which finished third. The party ran alone in the 1998 elections but failed to win a seat. They also failed to win a seat in the 2003 elections. For the 2008 elections, the party was part of the Patriotic Alliance for Change, which won two seats.

Electoral history

Presidential elections

Chamber of Deputies elections

Senate elections

References

Bibliography

Further reading
 

Formerly banned socialist parties
Full member parties of the Socialist International
Political parties established in 1951
Political parties in Paraguay
Social democratic parties in South America
Socialism in Paraguay